Good Times: The Very Best of the Hits & the Remixes is a two-disc compilation album, of recordings by American R&B bands Chic and Sister Sledge, released by Warner Music in 2005, an expanded re-release of 1999's single-disc compilation The Very Best of Chic & Sister Sledge. Disc one contains the original recordings made between the years 1973 and 1982, disc two extended versions and remixes dating from 1982 to 2005.
(Note: track 1, disc 2.)

Track listing
All tracks written by Bernard Edwards and Nile Rodgers unless otherwise noted.
Disc one:
"We Are Family" (7" Edit) - 3:24
 Sister Sledge
"Le Freak" (7" Edit) - 3:31
 Chic
"Good Times" (7" Edit) -  3:36
 Chic
"Lost in Music" (7" Edit)  - 3:19
 Sister Sledge
"Everybody Dance" (7" Edit) - 4:08
 Chic
"I Want Your Love" (7" Edit) - 3:21
 Chic
"He's the Greatest Dancer"  - 6:09
 Sister Sledge
"Chic Cheer"  - 4:36
 Chic
"Dance, Dance, Dance (Yowsah, Yowsah, Yowsah)" (7" Edit) - 3:38
 Chic
"My Forbidden Lover"  - 4:34
 Chic
"Thinking of You" - 4:26
 Sister Sledge
"Hangin'"  (7" Edit) - 3:34
 Chic
"All American Girls" (Sledge, Walden, Willis) - 3:52
 Sister Sledge
"Mama Never Told Me" (Bell, Hurtt) - 3:17
 Sister Sledge
"My Feet Keep Dancing" (7" Edit) - 3:44
 Chic
"Dancing on the Jagged Edge" (Bryant, Herring, McBroom) - 3:33
 Sister Sledge
"Got to Love Somebody" (7" Edit) - 3:33
 Sister Sledge
"Frankie"  (Denny) - 3:52
 Sister Sledge

Disc two: 
"We Are Family" (N.B. Album version - listed as Sure Is Pure Remix) -  8:21
  Sister Sledge
"I Want Your Love" (Stonebridge Remix) - 8:42
  Chic
"Thinking of You" (Ramp Remix) - 7:25
  Sister Sledge
"Hangin'" (Album version) - 5:12
  Chic
"We Are Family" (Steve Anderson DMC Remix) - 8:09
  Sister Sledge
"Lost in Music" (Sure Is Pure Remix) - 8:33
  Sister Sledge
"He's the Greatest Dancer" (Brutal Bill Remix) - 5:29
  Sister Sledge
"Good Times" (A Touch of Jazz Remix) - 5:15
  Chic
"Jack le Freak" ("Le Freak", 1987 Remix, 12" Mix) - 8:22
  Chic
"Megachic Medley: Le Freak/Everybody Dance/Good Times/I Want Your Love"  - 7:27
  Chic

External links

2005 greatest hits albums
2005 remix albums
Chic (band) compilation albums
Sister Sledge albums
Albums produced by Nile Rodgers
Albums produced by Bernard Edwards
Warner Music Group remix albums